Leigh Allen Wallace Jr. (February 5, 1927 - October 7, 2010) was bishop of the Episcopal Diocese of Spokane, serving from 1979 to 1990.

Wallace was the son of college football All-American and noted wrestling coach Polly Wallace.

References 

Retired Spokane Bishop Leigh Wallace dies in Montana

1927 births
2010 deaths
20th-century American Episcopalians
Episcopal bishops of Spokane